Saffold is an unincorporated community in Early County, Georgia, United States.  Its western boundary is the Chattahoochee River also bordering Gordon, Alabama. U.S. Route 84 and SR 370 pass through the community. It is located 20 miles south of Blakely, 21 miles southeast of Dothan, Alabama and two miles northwest of Jakin.

History
The community has the name of a local family of early settlers.

References

Unincorporated communities in Georgia (U.S. state)
Unincorporated communities in Early County, Georgia